Pico Mágina is a  mountain in Spain.

Geography 
The mountain is located in Jaén Province, in the northern part of the autonomous community of Andalusia. It's the highest peak of the province and also of Sierra Mágina, and is located on the border between the municipalities of Albanchez de Mágina and Huelma.

Access to the summit 
The summit can be accessed by hiking trails. The walk up to the summit is quite long: the first part follows a dirt road and the last one a hiking path through rocky terrain.

Nature conservation 
The mountain and most of its chain are included from 1989 in the  Parque Natural de Sierra Mágina.

See also

Baetic System

References

External links
  Route to Pico Mágina from A-324 road Huelma-Cambil on www.jaenparaisointerior.es

Baetic System
Mountains of Andalusia
Geography of the Province of Jaén (Spain)
Two-thousanders of Spain